Edible Manhattan is a food magazine and website that covers local food and drink makers, restaurants, farmers markets, food culture and events in Manhattan. The publication also hosts various events including Edible Escape, Good Beer and Good Cider.

Scope
The magazine is available online, through subscription or for free at select Manhattan retailers. The articles are written by staff writers and local freelancers. Edible Manhattan is published by Stephen Munshin and editor-in-chief Brian Halweil, a sustainable food writer and activist who is also editor of Edible Brooklyn, Edible East End and Edible Long Island.

Edible Manhattan covers a diverse range of topics from DIY crafts, locavore, local establishments and the food scene in Manhattan. The publication was  nominated for James Beard Foundation awards for various columns and contributing writers in 2011 and 2012.

History
Edible Manhattan debuted in September 2008. The first issue included articles about Isaac Mizrahi's kitchen, Mark Israel's Doughnut Plant, rooftop beekeepers, and Nach Waxman's Kitchen Arts & Letters.

Events
The magazine also hosts events, including Food Loves Tech and Good Beer, an annual food and drink event featuring local breweries, the Edible Coffee Summit hosted with Breville, and Good Cider, a festival featuring local cider and food pairings that benefits the New York Cider Association.

References

Lifestyle magazines published in the United States
Magazines established in 2008
Magazines published in New York City
Food and drink magazines
2008 establishments in New York City